A344 can refer to:
A344 highway (Nigeria), a highway in Nigeria
A344 road (England), a former road in Wiltshire near Stonehenge